New Whirl Odor is the ninth studio album by American hip hop group Public Enemy, released in the U.S. on November 1, 2005. The title is a pun on the New World Order conspiracy theory. "MKLVFKWR (Make Love, Fuck War)" features the artist Moby.

Reception
Entertainment Weekly (No. 848, p. 77) - "[I]t's refreshing to hear Public Enemy frontman Chuck D's stentorian voice hectoring, indicting, and pontificating on New Whirl Odor like it was 1989 all over again." - Grade: B
Mojo (p. 120) - 4 stars out of 5 -- "Anyone needing passionate music that's both socially and politically engaged need look no further."
Mojo (p. 60) - Ranked #2 in Mojo's "Top Ten Urban Albums of 2005."

Track listing

References

2005 albums
Public Enemy (band) albums